David Griggs may refer to:

David Griggs (American football) (1967–1995), American football linebacker in the National Football League
S. David Griggs (1939–1989), American astronaut
David T. Griggs (1911–1974), American geophysicist
David Griggs (artist), Australian artist whose work featured in ArtExpress in 1994